

Awards 
Winners will be listed first and highlighted in boldface:

References

External links
 Indie Series Awards History and Archive of Past Winners

Indie Series Awards
2014 film awards